Balangoda Ananda Maitreya Thero  (23 August 1896 — 8 July 1998) was a Sri Lankan Buddhist monk who was one of the most distinguished scholars and expositors of Theravada Buddhism in the twentieth century. He was highly respected by Sri Lankan Buddhists, who believed that he had achieved a higher level of spiritual development. Sri Lankan Buddhists also considered Balangoda Ananda Maitreya Thero as a Bodhisattva, who will attain Buddhahood in a future life.

Balangoda Ananda Maitreya Thero lived a modest life and did a great service for the propagation of Buddhist philosophy. In recognition of his valuable service at the Sixth Buddhist council held in Burma, the Burmese government conferred on him the title of Agga Maha Pandita (Chief Great Scholar) in 1956. Later in March 1997, the Burmese government conferred on Balangoda Ananda Maitreya Thero the highest Sangha title, Abhidhaja Maha Rattha Guru (Most Eminent Great Spiritual Teacher), which is equivalent to Sangharaja, in honor of his unique service to the Buddhist religion.

Biography
Balangoda Ananda Maitreya Thero was born on 23 August 1896 in Kirindigala, Balangoda, to the family of N. A. Matthias Appuhamy (Maddumahamy) and B. Heenmanike. His birth name was Punchi Mahattaya a.k.a. William. Because Punchi Mahattaya's mother died when he was 14 days old, he was brought up by his father's brother and his wife. 
Punchi Mahattaya had his primary education at Kumara Vidyalaya, Balangoda.He had his secondary education from Ananda College Colombo.

At the age of 15 he had decided to enter the order of Buddhist monks and was ordained as a Samanera at the temple Sri Nandaramaya, Udumulla, Balangoda on 2 March 1911. He was ordained under the guidance of Daamahana Dhammananda Thero and Deniyaye Seelananda Thero was his primary teacher (Upaadhyaayanwahanse). Balangdoda Ananda Maitreya Thero received his Upasampada on 14 July 1916 at Olu Gantota Udakukhepa Seema, Balangoda.
 
Thero continued his studies after becoming a monk and later became a scholar in Buddhism and languages. Thero entered Ananda College, Colombo in 1919 and became a teacher of the same school in 1922. Unusually for a Theravada teacher, he publicly studied some other traditions, such as Mahayana Buddhism, mantra and esoteric yoga. This is understandable when one realizes that he was a theosophist as well as a Buddhist. He was a self learner in most of his areas of studies.

Ananda Maitreya Thero was the first Dharmarcharya (teacher of Buddhism) at Nalanda College Colombo, when it was first established in 1925. It was Thero who named it 'Nalanda' and chose Apadana Sobhini Panna meaning wisdom beautifies character as Nalanda College's motto, which is still being used. Later he became the professor of Mahayana Buddhism at Vidyodaya University, Sri Lanka. He was appointed to the post of Dean, Faculty of Buddhist Studies in 1963. On 1 October 1966, he was appointed to the post of Vice Chancellor at the same university.

Ananda Maitreya Thero's first overseas Dhamma journey was to Kerala, India in 1926. He opened the Sri Dhammananda Pirivena, Colombo in 1930. 
On 18 January 1954, Thero was appointed to the post of Sangha Nayaka of Sabaragamu-Saddhammawansa Nikaya and in the same year he participated in the Sixth Buddhist council held in Myanmar. On 2 September 1969, Ananda Maitreya Thero was appointed as the President of Amarapura Sangha Sabhā of Sri Lanka.

Ananda Maitreya Thero was famous for his achievements in Buddhist meditation. He was known to have practiced both Samatha meditation and Vipassana meditation to a great extent and was considered to be having a highly developed mind through his meditation. Many Buddhists have experienced his powerful spiritual blessings in many more ways than one. His teachings and life have been an inspiration to many aspiring monks and lay followers.

Ananda Maitreya Thero, along with Narada Thero and Madihe Pannaseeha Thero, was and still is one of the foremostly revered and respected Buddhist monks of the twentieth century in Sri Lanka. His work and sacrifices with Anagarika Dharmapala was one of the steering forces of the upholding of Buddhism in Sri Lanka at one stage. Thero also traveled to many countries in the world for the propagation of Buddhism. Balangoda Ananda Maitreya Thero died at 11.40 p.m. on 18 July 1998 at the age of 101.

Degrees and titles

In 1955, the Government of Myanmar (then Burma) conferred him the title Agga Maha Pandita (Great Chief Scholar) to honour his unprecedented service at the Sixth Buddhist council. To honor his unique service to the Buddha Śāsana, Myanmar also conferred him the highest Sangha title, Abhidhaja Maharatthaguru (Most Eminent Great Spiritual Teacher), which is equivalent to Sangharaja in 1997. Ananda Maithreya Thero received the Thripitaka Vaagishwaracharya Pravachana Visharada Raajakeeya Panditha honorary degree from the Government of Sri Lanka. In addition to that, Nayaka Thero has received two honorary titles, Saahithyasuuri from Vidyodaya University and Saahithya Chakrawarthi from Vidyalankara University.

The humbleness of Maha Nayaka Thero's character is clearly shown, when he publicly stated that he had no liking whatsoever for titles and awards, but that he was rather accepting it to satisfy the presenter. He quoted Buddha in his speech saying "I often remind myself of My Great Buddha's preaching in the Samyutta Nikaya or the Abhidhamma Pitaka of the worthlessness and futileness of the craving for awards, titles and commanding positions".

Survey of writings

Ananda Maitreya Thero wrote nearly fifty books on Suttas (scripture), Vinaya (monastic discipline), on Abhidhamma (metaphysics), and on Pali and Sanskrit grammar. His book, Sakyasimhavadanaya hevat Buddha Charita (The Life of the Buddha), is considered as a textbook. Most of his books are written in English and Sinhala languages.

Meditation on Breathing
Easy steps to English
Life of the Buddha
Bhavana Deepaniya
Sambodhi Prarthana
A Hand Book of Spoken English
Dhamsabhava
Sathara Paramarthaya
Buddha Dharmaya
Vidharshana Bhavanava
Meditation Sur La Respiration
Maithree Bhavanava
Anaphana Sathi Bhavanava
Shamatha Bhavanava
Udanaya

Ananda Maitreya Thero translation of the Dhammapada is published internationally.
 The Dhammapada: The Path of Truth: Softcover, Wisdom Pubns,

References

Further reading
 Dhammalankara, Iththapane. Budu Bawa Pathana Balangoda Ananda Maithreya Maha Naahimi (බුදු බව පතන බලන්ගොඩ ආනන්ද මෛත්‍රෙය මහනාහිමි), Sri Devi Printers (Pvt) Ltd (1992),

External links 
 Books by Balangoda Ananda Maitreya Thero
 History of Nalanda College Colombo
 Balangoda Ananda Maitreya Thero's Audio Sermons

1896 births
1998 deaths
Alumni of Ananda College
Sri Lankan scholars of Buddhism
Theravada Buddhism writers
Theravada Buddhist monks
Sri Lankan centenarians
Sri Lankan Theravada Buddhists
Sri Lankan Buddhist monks
Academic staff of the University of Sri Jayewardenepura
Bodhisattvas
Faculty of Nalanda College, Colombo
Faculty of Ananda College
Sinhalese monks
Men centenarians
20th-century Buddhist monks
Sri Lankan recipients of Agga Maha Pandita
Sri Lankan recipients of Abhidhaja Maha Rattha Guru